Massimo Oddo  (born 14 June 1976) is an Italian professional football manager and a former player who played as a full-back. He is currently in charge as the head coach of  club SPAL.

Oddo played for several Italian clubs throughout his career, although he is mainly remembered for his time with Lazio, where he won the Coppa Italia, and in particular, Milan, where he won several titles, including the UEFA Champions League and the Scudetto; he also had a spell on loan with German club Bayern Munich. At international level he represented the Italian squad at UEFA Euro 2004, and was also part of the team that won the 2006 FIFA World Cup.

Club career

Oddo started his career at Renato Curi Angolana of Serie D, and moved to A.C. Milan youth team in 1993. After spending two years on the bench, in hope of more playing opportunities he moved to Serie C team Fiorenzuola on loan. It was followed by other three Serie C groups (Monza, Prato, Lecco). He returned to promoted Serie B team Monza in 1998, and left a year later for Napoli (in a co-ownership deal). He helped Napoli win promotion to Serie A after a successful 1999–2000 Serie B and joined Hellas Verona that summer. While at Verona, Oddo completed his obligatory military service. He would spend Monday through Thursday at the military barracks and then on Fridays would join up with his teammates for training.

After two successful seasons with Verona, Italian giants S.S. Lazio purchased him. At Lazio he had the opportunity to play in the UEFA Champions league in the season 2003–04 and the UEFA Cup competition in the seasons 2002–03 and 2004–05. The team made it to the semi finals in 2003. Moreover, his third season with Lazio earned him the Coppa Italia winner title. He became the captain of Lazio for the first half of the 2006–07 season following the departure of Fabio Liverani to Fiorentina.

On 23 January 2007, it was announced that Milan and Lazio had reached an accord for Oddo's transfer to the Rossoneri, after a long period of negotiation. The overall price was €10.75 million (cash plus Pasquale Foggia, who had been on loan at the club since the start of the season) and Oddo waived some of his wage, made the deal worth €12 million in total. He signed a contract until 30 June 2011. Months later, Oddo was the starting right back in the 2007 UEFA Champions League Final and helped Milan gain their seventh European Cup in a 2–1 win over Liverpool, as well as the club's fifth UEFA Super Cup in August when they had to face 2007 UEFA Cup winners, Sevilla.

With the arrival of Gianluca Zambrotta, Oddo had to compete with him on the right back position. On 28 August 2008, Oddo moved to Bayern Munich on a one-year loan with the option of making the move permanent, however, at the end of the 2008–09 season, the German club confirmed that it would not take that option, and he returned to Milan, with Zambrotta moved to left back and Oddo competed with Ignazio Abate for the right back position.

On 21 July 2010, he extended his contract to last until 30 June 2012. A day after, Zambrotta also signed a new deal.

After being mostly frozen out of the Milan squad during the starting part of the 2010–11 season, he made his season debut against former club Napoli after an early first half head injury to left back Luca Antonini, furthermore he provided two assists, one to Robinho for the opening goal and another for Zlatan Ibrahimović.

On 31 August 2011, Oddo joined Lecce on a season-long loan.

Following the 2011–12 season, Oddo put an end to his career saying "I leave football. When you reach a certain age, you face a crossroad."

International career
Oddo made his national debut on 21 August 2002, in a 1–0 home defeat to Slovenia, replacing Matteo Brighi during the second half, as part of a reformed squad after the unsuccessful 2002 FIFA World Cup performance of the Azzurri, under Giovanni Trapattoni.

He was a starter at seven Euro 2004 qualifying matches. During the main competition in Portugal, he made one appearance, playing as a substitute in Italy's final group game against Bulgaria (22 June 2004); during the match, he supplied an assist for Cassano's goal, which helped Italy win the match 2–1, although they were eliminated from the tournament in the first round on direct encounters, following a three-way five-point tie with Denmark and Sweden. Subsequently, Oddo was a member of Italy's championship winning squad during the 2006 FIFA World Cup under Marcello Lippi, as back up to Gianluca Zambrotta, making one substitute appearance in Italy's 3–0 win over Ukraine in the quarter-finals of the tournament. At the end of 2006 FIFA World Cup Final match in Germany, in which Italy defeated France 5–3 in a penalty shoot-out, Oddo chopped off a large chunk of his teammate Mauro Camoranesi's long hair as the rest of the squad danced around them in a circle.

Oddo scored his first and only international goal for Italy from the penalty spot in a Euro 2008 qualifying match on 7 October 2006 against Ukraine, under manager Roberto Donadoni, which ended in a 2–0 victory for the Italians. Oddo made his 34th and final appearance for Italy in a 3–1 win over Portugal on 6 February 2008.

Style of play
Oddo was primarily deployed on the right flank as an offensive full-back or wing-back, or even as a wide-midfielder on occasion, due to his stamina, work-rate, defensive consistency, attacking drive, and crossing ability. In his later career, he was deployed in a more defensive role as a central-defender. Despite being a defender, Oddo was known for his ability on set pieces and penalties.

Coaching career
After retirement, he decided to pursue a coaching career accepting an offer as youth coach of the Allievi Regionali B for Genoa in August 2013. He left his job in July 2014 to accept an offer to guide the Primavera (under-19) squad of hometown club Pescara.

On 23 May 2015, he was promoted as head coach of Pescara after the dismissal of Marco Baroni with only one game remaining, a home match against Livorno (coached by former Italy teammate Christian Panucci), with both teams still involved in the race for a promotion playoff spot. The game ended with a 3–0 win for Pescara, which qualified the team to the Serie A promotion playoffs. On 9 June 2016, Oddo led Pescara to Serie A promotion after beating out Trapani 3–1 on aggregate in the Serie B promotion play-off final. On 15 July 2016, Pescara extended Oddo's contract by three years, keeping him as manager of the club until June 2019. He was sacked on 14 February 2017.

On 21 November 2017, Oddo was named the head coach of Udinese following the sacking of Luigi Delneri. He was sacked on 24 April 2018, with Udinese in 15th place, as they lost 11 matches in a row.

On 29 October 2018, Serie B club Crotone announced the hiring of Oddo. However, he failed to change the fortunes of the club, failing to win a single game before resigning on 28 December following a 0–3 home defeat to Spezia.

On 7 June 2019, Oddo was appointed head coach of Perugia. He was dismissed by Perugia on 4 January 2020. He was rehired again on 19 July, and terminated on 19 August 2020.

On 29 August 2020, Oddo was appointed manager of Pescara. On 29 November 2020, he was fired by Pescara after only gaining four points in the first nine league games.

On 24 February 2022, he returned into management as the new head coach of Serie C promotion hopefuls Padova. Under his tenure, he guided Padova to win the 2021–22 Coppa Italia Serie C title, but failed automatic promotion by ending in second place behind Südtirol. He subsequently led Padova to a second consecutive promotion playoff final, where they were defeated by Palermo in a 0–2 aggregate loss. Due to failure in achieving promotion to Serie B, Oddo and Padova parted ways by mutual consent by the end of the season.

On 14 February 2023, Oddo was named head coach of Serie B relegation-struggling club SPAL, replacing Daniele De Rossi.

Personal life
Oddo is from the town of Pescara on the Adriatic coast, but has Sicilian origins.

Oddo's father, Francesco, is a football manager and former player. After leaving school, Oddo attended university to study law but left without graduating. He returned to university in 2007 but undertook a course in sport management.

He has two sons, Davide (born 30 November 2003) and Francesco (born 27 December 2008). Oddo is a trained barber and styled a lot of his Italy colleagues' hair at the World Cup 2006, earning him the nickname the Barber of Berlin.

Career statistics
Source:

Club

International

Managerial

Honours

Club
Lazio
Coppa Italia: 2003–04

Milan
Serie A: 2010–11
Supercoppa Italiana: 2011
UEFA Champions League 2006–07
UEFA Super Cup: 2007
FIFA Club World Cup: 2007

International
Italy
FIFA World Cup: 2006

Managerial
Padova
 Coppa Italia Serie C: 2021–22

Orders
 CONI: Golden Collar of Sports Merit: Collare d'Oro al Merito Sportivo: 2006

 4th Class / Officer: Ufficiale Ordine al Merito della Repubblica Italiana: 2006

References

 Parks, Tim (2003) A Season with Verona: Travels Around Italy in Search of Illusion, National Character and Goals. Vintage.

External links

 Playing stats at AIC.Football.it 
 International caps at FIGC.it 

1976 births
Living people
Sportspeople from the Province of Pescara
Italian footballers
Italian football managers
Italian expatriate footballers
Italy international footballers
FC Bayern Munich footballers
A.C. Milan players
U.S. Fiorenzuola 1922 S.S. players
A.C. Monza players
A.C. Prato players
Calcio Lecco 1912 players
S.S.C. Napoli players
Hellas Verona F.C. players
S.S. Lazio players
U.S. Lecce players
Serie A players
Serie B players
Serie C players
UEFA Euro 2004 players
2006 FIFA World Cup players
FIFA World Cup-winning players
Association football fullbacks
Bundesliga players
Expatriate footballers in Germany
Italian expatriate sportspeople in Germany
Serie A managers
Delfino Pescara 1936 managers
Udinese Calcio managers
F.C. Crotone managers
S.P.A.L. managers
Serie B managers
Serie C managers
UEFA Champions League winning players
Officers of the Order of Merit of the Italian Republic
People of Sicilian descent
Calcio Padova managers
Footballers from Abruzzo